The Corsican Brothers (French:Les frères corses) is a 1917 French silent adventure film directed by André Antoine and starring Henry Krauss, Romuald Joubé and Rose Dione. It is based on the 1844 novella The Corsican Brothers by Alexandre Dumas.

Cast
 Henry Krauss as Dumas père
 Romuald Joubé 
 Rose Dione
 Jacques Grétillat
 Henry Roussel 
 Gaston Glass 
 Philippe Garnier
 André Brulé 
 Max Charlier

References

Bibliography
 Levine, Alison. Framing the Nation: Documentary Film in Interwar France. A&C Black, 2011.

External links 
 

1917 films
French historical adventure films
French silent feature films
1910s historical adventure films
1910s French-language films
Films based on The Corsican Brothers
Films directed by André Antoine
Films set in Corsica
Films set in the 19th century
French black-and-white films
Silent historical adventure films
1910s French films